Laurynas Kulikas (born 13 April 1994) is a footballer who plays as a forward for Holstein Kiel II.

Career statistics

References

External links

1994 births
Living people
Russian people of Lithuanian descent
German footballers
Russian footballers
Association football forwards
2. Bundesliga players
Regionalliga players
FC St. Pauli II players
FC St. Pauli players
VfL Bochum players
VfL Bochum II players
Hamburger SV II players
FC Eintracht Norderstedt 03 players
TSV Steinbach Haiger players
VfR Neumünster players
Holstein Kiel II players
Sportspeople from Kiel